Garry Glenwood Bauman (July 21, 1940 – October 16, 2006) was a Canadian ice hockey goaltender who played 35 games in the National Hockey League with the Montreal Canadiens and Minnesota North Stars from 1967 to 1969. The rest of his career, which lasted from 1964 to 1972, was spent in various minor leagues.

Playing career
Bauman and Montreal teammate Charlie Hodge shared goaltending duties in the 1967 NHL All-Star game, combining to record the first—and still only—shutout in the history of the event. It was one of only three games Bauman played with Montreal before being selected by the North Stars in the 1967 NHL Expansion Draft. He played parts of two seasons with the Stars, and then returned to Alberta to play for Calgary in the Alberta Senior League.

Career statistics

Regular season and playoffs

Awards and honours

References

External links
 

1940 births
2006 deaths
AHCA Division I men's ice hockey All-Americans
Calgary Stampeders (PrHL) players
Canadian ice hockey goaltenders
Ice hockey people from Alberta
Memphis South Stars players
Michigan Tech Huskies men's ice hockey players
Minnesota North Stars players
Montreal Canadiens players
NCAA men's ice hockey national champions
Omaha Knights (CHL) players
People from Innisfail, Alberta
Prince Albert Mintos players
Quebec Aces (AHL) players
Rochester Americans players